The Tuo Chiang-class corvette is a Taiwanese-designed class of fast (up to ) and stealthy multi-mission corvettes built for the Republic of China (Taiwan) Navy. It is designed to counter the numerous and increasingly sophisticated People's Liberation Army Navy ships by utilizing hit-and-run tactics, and thus featured clean upper structure design with very few extrusions to reduce radar signature, pre-cooled engine exhaust to reduce infrared signature, and a reduced visual signature to reduce chance of detection.

Development 

The program was announced by the Republic of China (Taiwan) Ministry of National Defense (MND) on 12 April 2010. It was developed by the Naval Shipbuilding Center in Kaohsiung, The Tuo Chiang class was developed to address common weakness of traditional small warships such as patrol craft and corvettes not fit for extended periods of time in rough seas around Taiwan Island.

In 2011, the Taiwanese Legislative Yuan approved a NT$24.98 billion (US$853.4 million) budget to fund the construction of up to 12 ships. On 18 April 2011 a top military officer and a lawmaker announced that the construction of a 500-ton prototype would begin in 2012. In the Taipei Aerospace and Defense Technology Exhibition in 2013, the Navy unveiled a model of the Hsun Hai project corvette. The prototype of the Hsun Hai program was named and christened on Friday, 14 March 2014 as ROCS Tuo Chiang (PGG-618) in honor of the gunboat in the September 2 Sea Battle during Second Taiwan Strait Crisis.
The Ministry of National Defense has prepared a budget of more than 16.395 billion yuan from next year to 2025 in order to secure the follow-up mass production of three Tuojiang ships. The mass production cost of the Tuojiang ship is 3.2 billion higher than that of the first prototype ship already in service, after deducting the hull. After the extra 500 million yuan in Taitai, the cost of the mass-produced type is more than 2.7 billion yuan more than that of the prototype ship. The Navy said that the prototype ship did not take into account the cost of missiles, and the mass-produced type was mainly used for combat readiness. The anti-aircraft missile is the standard configuration of the ship, and the cost is the calculated construction cost after being quoted by the Chinese Academy of Sciences

In early 2016, the ROC Navy began plans for procuring three air defense frigates.  It has been speculated that these frigates would possibly be catamarans based on the Tuo River-class hull.  Expected weapon systems include the Mark 41 Vertical Launching System (VLS) equipped with a naval variant of the Sky Bow III and the Sky Sword II, as well as the Sea Oryx CIWS system. It will field a ballistic missile defense version of the Sky Bow III missile defense system to shoot down incoming enemy ballistic missiles.

In 2019 work commenced on the first of twelve 600+ ton coastal patrol vessels for the Coast Guard Administration, the Anping-class offshore patrol vessel, based on the Tuo Chiang-class corvette at the Jong Shyn Shipbuilding Company's Kaohsiung shipyard.

In December 2020 the first of the improved Tuo Chiang-class corvettes, PGG-619 Ta Chiang, was launched in Yilan. 6 improved models are to be delivered by 2023. According to Janes the new models feature improvements in "weaponry, mission systems, and design."

In 2021 Ta Chiang completed the testing and evaluation of the TC-2N missile.

Ta Chiang has been positively received by military analysts.

Lungteh launched the third Tuo Chiang-class corvette in February 2023.

Design 
It is armed with eight subsonic Hsiung Feng II and eight supersonic Hsiung Feng III anti-ship missiles launchers, a Phalanx Close-In Weapons System, and a  main gun. Taiwan Security Analysis Center (TAISAC) stated that the ship features stealth technologies to minimize radar detection, a combat system that includes a distributed-architecture combat direction system known as "Taiwan Aegis" developed by the National Chung-Shan Institute of Science and Technology and an indigenous search/track and fire-control radar and electro-optical director.

The ship increases its survivability in naval warfare by utilizing advanced stealth technology and low radar cross section (RCS), which makes it less detectable by radar and allows it to be obscured by background radar noise when operating closer to the coastline.

Ships of class

See also
 Type 037 corvette
 Type 022 missile boat

References

External links

 NCSIST videos: 沱江艦, 多頻段干擾彈及多載台自動防禦系統, and 2017台北國際航太展-雷射預警
 Hsun Hai (Swift Sea) Tuo Jiang – missile corvette – Globalsecurity
 Taiwan Navy Emphasizing Domestic Shipbuilding Program in Ongoing Maritime Restructure – USNI News

Corvettes of the Republic of China Navy
Military history of Taiwan
Ships built in the Republic of China
Military catamarans
Corvette classes